John Dopyera (Slovak: Ján Dopjera; 1893–1988) was a Slovak-American inventor and entrepreneur, and a maker of stringed instruments. His inventions include the resonator guitar and important contributions in the early development of the electric guitar.

Early life
John Dopyera was one of 10 siblings born at the closing of the 19th century. His father, Jozef Dopyera, was a miller in Dolná Krupá, Slovakia, where they moved shortly after the birth of John. Gifted in music, Jozef played and constructed his own violins; the makers of which were popular around Slovakia for their craftsmanship. Under his father's guidance, John built his first fiddle still in his boyhood days in Dolná Krupá. In 1908, the Dopyeras emigrated from Slovakia to California, United States sensing a war would erupt in Europe. In the 1920s, Dopyera opened his own store in Los Angeles where he worked making and repairing fiddles, banjos, and other wooden string instruments. Around this time, Dopyera patented several improvements on the banjo.

Middle years
In 1925, Dopyera was asked by vaudeville promoter George Beauchamp to create a louder guitar.  Beauchamp needed a guitar that could be heard over other instruments when played in an orchestra. Dopyera invented a guitar with three aluminum cones called resonators (similar to diaphragms inside a speaker) mounted beneath the bridge, which was much louder than the regular acoustic guitar.  The tone of the guitar was rich and metallic.  Dopyera and his brothers Rudy and Emil, as well as other  investors,  founded the National String Instrument Corporation to manufacture the new type of "resophonic" guitar, which was sold mainly to musicians working in cinemas and jazz clubs in the USA. After several years, the three brothers left the corporation and started a new company, Dobro (the name they also gave to the instrument). The new name combined the "Do" in Dopyera and "bro" in brothers—and also means "good" in Slovak.  Their slogan was: Dobro means good in any language!.

Later years
In 1932, working together with Art Stimson, Dopyera invented a new type of guitar design later recognized to be first ever industrially produced electrified Spanish guitar in the world. Dopyera also invented a string-gripping device on acoustic guitars, the forebear to that on all guitars today. Dopyera's later patents included resophonic additions to nearly every string instrument, continued patents for the designs of banjos and violins, including the unique Dopera Bantar, which was a cross between the 5-string Banjo and 6-string Guitar. The Dopera Bantars, though extremely rare were used by a few influential artists of the 1960s, including Bob Dylan.  As illustrated with the Bantar, John removed the "Y" from the Dopyera name, when labeling his new instruments, as he reasoned that "Dopera" was easier for the public to understand and pronounce. A patent for an electric violin is also noted. In 1961 they patented the Zorko bass, and then sold the design to Ampeg who produced the Baby Bass from 1962 to 1970. The Dopyera brothers later moved to Chicago, where they made millions of dollars with the Valco music company and other business interests. John elected to stay in Los Angeles and continue making instruments. He was never rich, and was famous only among a small circle of people who knew he had invented the resonator/resophonic guitar. He died at the age of 94 in 1988, having registered some 40 patents.

Legacy
The Dobro resonator guitar was fundamental to the evolution of bluegrass music. The design cut through all musical boundaries, however, proving equally at home in folk, rock country, blues and jazz. In 1992, Slovak blues guitarist Peter Radványi co-founded the Dobrofestival in western Slovakia's Trnava, a week-long gathering of resophonic guitar enthusiasts including some of the best bluegrass, blues, and Hawaiian guitar players in the world. The last Dobrofest was in June, 2008. In addition, there is a small museum in Trnava called the Dobro Hall of Fame.

See also
Dobro

References

External links
John Dopyera Bio
Dobro Guitars
Guitar Legend Lives On
Colin McCubbin's pictorial history of National
Dobrofest in Trnava, Slovakia

1893 births
American people of Slovak descent
Austro-Hungarian emigrants to the United States
Slovak inventors
Inventors of musical instruments
1988 deaths
20th-century American inventors
People from Senica District